Jackson Ferris (born January 15, 2004) is an American baseball pitcher in the Chicago Cubs organization.

Amateur career
Ferris grew up in Mount Airy, North Carolina. He initially attended Mount Airy High School before transferring to IMG Academy in Bradenton, Florida, after his sophomore year. As a junior, Ferris went 8–0 with a 0.55 ERA and 86 strikeouts in  innings pitched. Ferris pitched for Team USA during the summer prior to his senior season. He was a teammate of fellow top 2022 draft prospect Elijah Green. Ferris signed to play at Ole Miss in November 2021 during the early signing period. He had initially committed to play at North Carolina State, but flipped his commitment at the beginning of his junior year. Ferris was named a preseason All-American by Baseball America entering his senior season.

Professional career 
The Chicago Cubs selected Ferris in the second round with the 47th overall pick in the 2022 Major League Baseball draft. He signed with the Cubs on July 30, 2022, for an over-slot signing bonus of $3,005,000.

References

External links

Living people
2004 births
Baseball pitchers
Baseball players from North Carolina